States is the debut studio album by indie folk band the Paper Kites. The album was released on 1 August 2013, in Australia and 1 October 2013, in North America.

Track listing
All songs written by Sam Bentley, except where noted.
"Malleable Beings" – 5:05
"St. Clarity" – 3:47
"Living Colour" – 4:24
"Gates" – 4:40
"Young" – 3:41
"A Lesson from Mr. Gray" – 4:37
"Tin Lover" – 3:19
"Cold Kind Hand" – 4:01
"Never Heard a Sound" (Bentley, David Powys) – 2:54
"In Reverie" – 3:50
"Tenenbaum" – 3:39
"Portrait 19" – 4:46
"I Done You So Wrong" (Bentley, Christina Lacy) – 7:13

Personnel
Credits adapted from State notes.

The Paper Kites

 Sam Bentley: vocals, guitar, keyboards
 Christina Lacy: vocals, guitar, keyboards
 David Powys: vocals, guitar, banjo, lap steel guitar
 Josh Bentley: drums, percussion
 Sam Rasmussen: bass, syntheziser

Production

 The Paper Kites  – production
 Wayne Conolly – production, engineering, mixing
 Anna Laverty – assistance engineering

Recording

 Recorded at Sing Sing Studios and Albert Studios
 Mastered at Sterling Sound

Charts

References

2013 debut albums
The Paper Kites albums
Nettwerk Records albums